was a youth organization formed on 9 March 1943 by the Imperial Japanese Army in the occupied Dutch East Indies (present-day Indonesia). The purpose of the Seinendan organization was ostensibly to educate and train young people so that they could defend their homeland from imperialism. Its real purpose, however, was to prepare the Indonesian youths to assist the Japanese military against the expected Allied invasion of the Indonesian archipelago. The organization was considered paramilitary in nature and under the leadership of the occupation authorities. The requirements to become a member proved not too strict and soon there were 35,500 youth members aged 14 to 25 years old from all over Java. This number had grown to about 500,000 youths by the time Japan surrendered.

See also
 Collaboration with the Axis powers
 Japanese occupation of the Dutch East Indies
 Keibōdan

References

Child soldiers in World War II
Indonesian collaborators with Imperial Japan
Japanese occupation of the Dutch East Indies
Military units and formations of Imperial Japan